Putnam Memorial State Park is a history-oriented public recreation area in the town of Redding, Connecticut. The state park preserves the site that Major General Israel Putnam chose as the winter encampment for his men in the winter of 1778/1779 during the American Revolutionary War.  It is Connecticut's oldest state park, created in 1887 at the instigation of Redding town residents. The park was listed on the National Register of Historic Places in 1970.

In addition to its historic features, the park's  include facilities for hiking, picnicking, pond fishing, and winter sports. The park is located at the intersection of Route 107 and Route 58 and is managed by the Connecticut Department of Energy and Environmental Protection.

History
Over 3,000 men were sent into winter quarters spread throughout three camps in Redding. The camps were established to keep an eye on the storehouses in Danbury, Connecticut, and to protect Long Island Sound and the Hudson River Valley. Many of these men were the same who had suffered at Valley Forge the previous winter. The 2nd Canadian Regiment, or Congress' Own, under the command of Moses Hazen and the 2nd New Hampshire Regiment under the command of Enoch Poor were stationed at this location.

Preservation of the park grounds was initiated in 1887 when Aaron Treadwell, at the encouragement of Redding historian Charles Burr Todd, sold 12.4 acres to the state for one dollar. In 1955, the Park and Forest Commission took over park management. The park was decommissioned with maintenance performed by local volunteers during most of the 1990s. It reopened under state auspices in 1997.

Activities and amenities
Visitor Center: The Visitor Center features informational kiosks about Putnam's life, the encampment, and the park's history. The building was reconstructed in 2005, using much of the material from the original pavilion structure erected in 1893.
Museum: The museum displays artifacts found at the park as well as donated items. The exhibits demonstrate colonial life and honor the men who were stationed here.
Putnam Statue: In 1969 at age 93, the sculptress Anna Hyatt Huntington donated the equestrian statue of General Israel Putnam which is situated at the entrance to the park. It depicts the horse going down steps. In February 1779, General Putnam escaped a cohort of British Dragoons by riding his horse down 100 stone steps at Horses Neck, Greenwich, Connecticut.
Grounds: There are numerous firebacks, which are the remains of the enlisted soldiers' chimneys, as well as reconstructed replicas of the guard house and an officers' quarters. A  monument commemorates the commanding officers and men who were stationed here. Natural features found in the park include the rock shelter called Philip's Cave and large glacial erratics.
Events: On alternating years, the park hosts a reenactment (every other November) or a ghost walk (every other October). A guided winter walk is held every December. Events are hosted by the organization Friends & Neighbors of Putnam Park.

See also

National Register of Historic Places listings in Fairfield County, Connecticut

References

External links

Putnam Memorial State Park: Connecticut's Valley Forge Friends & Neighbors (FANS) of Putnam Park
Putnam Memorial State Park Connecticut Department of Energy and Environmental Protection
Putnam Memorial State Park Map Connecticut Department of Energy and Environmental Protection
Map of Self-guided Walk General Israel Putnam Website

State parks of Connecticut
Connecticut in the American Revolution
National Register of Historic Places in Fairfield County, Connecticut
Bethel, Connecticut
Redding, Connecticut
Parks in Fairfield County, Connecticut
Museums in Fairfield County, Connecticut
American Revolutionary War museums in Connecticut
Protected areas established in 1887
Military in Connecticut
Parks on the National Register of Historic Places in Connecticut
American Revolutionary War sites
1887 establishments in Connecticut